Old Stone Church is a historic church on Conway Road at White Road in Chesterfield, Missouri.
It was built in 1841 and added to the National Register of Historic Places in 1973.

References

Churches completed in 1841
Religious buildings and structures in St. Louis County, Missouri
Churches on the National Register of Historic Places in Missouri
National Register of Historic Places in St. Louis County, Missouri